The Thelon River ("on the other side") stretches  across northern Canada. Its source is Whitefish Lake in the Northwest Territories, and it flows east to Baker Lake in Nunavut. The Thelon ultimately drains into Hudson Bay at Chesterfield Inlet.

Geography

Located far from almost all human development, the Thelon and its surroundings are entirely pristine wilderness. It has been described as Canada's remotest river.

Fauna
Approximately 100 moose and more than 2,000 muskoxen forage on the land around the Thelon. 300,000 migrating barren-ground caribou cross the river every fall and spring.

History

Inuit - including Caribou Inuit and Copper Inuit - have long occupied the sparsely-populated lands around the Thelon. Artifacts of Inuit hunting and travel (including inukshuk guide stones) are readily observed near the river.

In 1770–71, English explorer Samuel Hearne crossed the Thelon while exploring Canada's northern interior. James William Tyrrell led an expedition through the area in 1900.

Over the winter of 1926–27, John Hornby starved to death on the Thelon along with two other men. They had planned to hunt migrating caribou, but failed to find the herd. Nevertheless, on the basis of Hornby's earlier explorations with James Charles Critchell Bullock in 1923, the Thelon Game Sanctuary was established in 1927, renamed the Thelon Wildlife Sanctuary in 1956.

In 1927(?), the Norwegian explorer and writer Helge Ingstad went by dog sled to the headwaters of the Thelon (Lynx Lake) together with native peoples from the east end of Great Slave Lake. This he detailed in his book The Land of Feast and Famine.

Tourism
In 1990, the lower  of the Thelon were designated a Canadian Heritage River. Although there is no road access to the river, a number of wilderness campers and canoeists visit the Thelon every summer.

Cultural references 
The basin of the Thelon is mentioned in the 1979 sci-fi novel Beetle in the Anthill by Boris and Arkady Strugatsky as the location of the embassy of Golovans: intelligent canoid (dog-like) race evolved at Saraksh planet.

See also
List of longest rivers of Canada
List of rivers of the Northwest Territories
List of rivers of Nunavut

References

External links
The Thelon River from the Canadian Heritage Rivers System
Map of the Thelon River

Rivers of Kivalliq Region
Rivers of the Northwest Territories
Canadian Heritage Rivers
Tributaries of Hudson Bay